Marco Delle Monache (born 3 February 2005) is an Italian professional footballer who plays for  club Pescara on loan from Sampdoria.

Early life 
Growing up in Cappelle sul Tavo, in the province of Pescara, Marco Delle Monache joined the Delfino Pescara academy in 2013, from Caldora, an amateur club in the same city.

Club career 

Having become a regular starter with the under-19, as he displayed an important attacking contribution, notably delivering a brace of assists during a 3–1 victory to Napoli, he played his first Serie C game on 22 January 2022, playing the last minutes of a 4–2 home win against Montevarchi.

The young player signed his first professional contract with the biggest club of Abruzzo in February 2022, making him a player of the Delfino until June 2024.

On 5 August 2022, Delle Monache signed with Sampdoria, but stayed at Pescara on loan.

International career 
Delle Monache is a youth international for Italy, having been selected with the under-17 by Bernardo Corradi in October 2021, for the 2022 European Championship qualification. He made his debut with the team as a substitute during the 5–0 win against Albania on the 27 October.

Style of play 
While still in the very early stages of his career and life, Delle Monache was already described as a player with great pace, creativity and technique. This then earned him comparaisons to the likes of Pasquale Foggia, Fabrizio Miccoli or even Lorenzo Insigne.

He is able to play both as a trequartista or an attacking winger (in Italian, an esterno offensivo), mainly on the left side of the attack.

A right-footed player, he distinguishes himself by dribbling the opponent and protecting the ball, while additionally having the ability to execute long risky passes, take free kicks and provide assists for his forwards. He also makes good use of his athleticism and tactical habilites in defense, with an effective pressing.

In September 2022, Delle Monache was included in The Guardian's list of the 60 best talents in the world to be born in 2005.

References

External links

2005 births
Living people
Italian footballers
Italy youth international footballers
Association football midfielders
Sportspeople from the Province of Pescara
Delfino Pescara 1936 players
Serie C players
Footballers from Abruzzo